Hazardia rosarica is a Mexican species of shrub in the family Asteraceae.

The plant is endemic to Mexico,  found only in the state of Baja California in northwestern Mexico.  It grows on the Pacific side of the Baja California Peninsula.

Description
Hazardia rosarica is a shrub up to 90 cm (3 feet) tall with lemon-scented foliage. It has several stems arising from a woody underground caudex.

The plant produces numerous flower heads each head with 12-30 yellow disc flowers but no ray flowers.

References

External links
Tropicos.org: Photo of herbarium specimen at Missouri Botanical Garden, collected in Baja California in 1967, isotype of Hazardia rosarica

rosarica
Flora of Baja California
Endemic flora of Mexico
Plants described in 1969
Taxa named by Reid Venable Moran